Ousmane Traoré (born 6 March 1977 in Ouagadougou) is a Burkinabé former professional footballer who played as a defender.

International career
Traoré was a member of the Burkina Faso national team at the 2004 African Nations Cup, which finished bottom of its group in the first round of competition, thus failing to secure qualification for the quarter-finals.

References

External links
 

Living people
1977 births
Sportspeople from Ouagadougou
Association football defenders
Burkinabé footballers
Burkina Faso international footballers
ASFA Yennenga players
ASOA Valence players
FC Lorient players
Grenoble Foot 38 players
AS Saint-Priest players
Al-Watani Club players
CO de Bamako players
Olympique de Valence players
FC Échirolles players
Ligue 2 players
Saudi Professional League players
2000 African Cup of Nations players
2002 African Cup of Nations players
2004 African Cup of Nations players
Burkinabé expatriate footballers
Expatriate footballers in France
Expatriate footballers in Mali
Expatriate footballers in Saudi Arabia
Burkinabé expatriate sportspeople in Mali
Burkinabé expatriate sportspeople in France
21st-century Burkinabé people
Chambéry SF players